Low Maynard Reservoir is located in Walthamstow in the London Borough of Waltham Forest. The storage reservoir is part of the Lee Valley Reservoir Chain and supplies drinking water to London.

History
The reservoir was constructed in the mid 19th century by the East London Waterworks Company on former marshland. It is now owned and managed by Thames Water.

Ecology 
The reservoir is part of the Walthamstow Reservoirs Site of Special Scientific Interest, and it supports a large concentration of breeding wildfowl.

The fringes of the reservoir contain species of plants uncommon in Greater London, including:

Caltha palustris Marsh-marigold
Schoenaoplectus lacustris Common Club-rush
Typha angustifolia Lesser bulrush
 Carex x subgracilis The 'graceful' sedge

Recreation 
Access to the water, which is by permit only, is popular with birdwatchers, walkers and anglers.

See also
 London water supply infrastructure

References

Sites of Special Scientific Interest in London
Thames Water reservoirs
Reservoirs in London
Drinking water reservoirs in England